Josh Whyle (born September 8, 1999) is an American football tight end who is currently waiting for the events of the 2023 NFL Draft. He played for the Cincinnati Bearcats of the American Athletic Conference.

Early years
Whyle grew up in Cincinnati, Ohio and attended La Salle High School. As a junior, he caught 40 passes for 546 yards and six touchdowns. Whyle had 37 receptions for 442 yards and three touchdowns in his senior seasons. Whyle was rated the second-best tight end recruit in Ohio and committed to play college football at Cincinnati over offers from Auburn, Georgia, Indiana, Kentucky, Louisville, Tennessee and Wisconsin.

College career
Whyle played in four total games during his freshman season before utilizing a redshirt. As a redshirt freshman, he caught two passes for 51 yards. Whyle finished his redshirt sophomore season with 28 receptions for 353 yards and six touchdowns and was named second team All-American Athletic Conference.

Statistics

Game statistics

References

External links
Cincinnati Bearcats bio

Living people
American football tight ends
Cincinnati Bearcats football players
Players of American football from Cincinnati
1999 births